The 2013–14 Spartan South Midlands Football League season (known as the 2013–14 Molten Spartan South Midlands Football League for sponsorship reasons) was the 17th in the history of Spartan South Midlands Football League a football competition in England.

Premier Division

The Premier Division featured 19 clubs which competed in the division last season, along with three clubs promoted from Division One:
London Lions
Cockfosters
Hoddesdon Town

League table

Results

Division One

Division One featured 20 clubs in the division for this season, of which there are four new clubs:
Baldock Town, joined from the Herts County League
Risborough Rangers, promoted from Division Two
Broxbourne Borough, promoted from Division Two
Arlesey Town Reserves, promoted from the Bedfordshire County Football League

League table

Results

Division Two

Division Two featured ten clubs which competed in the division last season, along with four new clubs:
Brimsdown, new club
Grendon Rangers, joined from the North Bucks & District League
New Bradwell St Peter, relegated from Division One
Willen

League table

References

External links
 Spartan South Midlands Football League

2013-14
9